Mignucci is an Italian surname. Notable people with this surname include:

 Andrés Mignucci (born 1957), Puerto Rican architect and urbanist
 Antonio Mignucci (born 1964), Puerto Rican oceanographer
 Pompeo Mignucci, (1597-1654), Italian archbishop
  (born 1965), Italian director